Ulrichen is a village in the municipality of Obergoms in the district of Goms in the canton of Valais in Switzerland.  The population was 219.

Ulrichen was an independent municipality until January 1, 2009, when it merged with Oberwald and Obergesteln to form the municipality Obergoms.

In Ulrichen, an airport is located.

Climate
Ulrichen has a Subarctic climate (Dfc) according to the Köppen Climate Classification, bordering a Warm-Summer humid continental climate (Dfb). Precipitation is spread evenly throughout the year. The town is known to receive high amounts of snow during the winter months.

References

External links

 Official website 

Former municipalities of Valais